Stephanie Quimco, better known as Quimchee, is a comics artist. She is author of WEBTOON series I Love Yoo, published since 2017. The webcomic tells the story of Shin-Ae Yoo, a young girl who finds herself the subject of fascination of half-brothers Yeong-Gi and Kousuke.

In 2018, Quimchee has received Ringo Awards for Fan Favorite New Series and was nominated as Best Webcomic, both for I Love Yoo. She also won the Ringo Awards for Favorite New Talent in the same year.

References

Webtoon creators